Sleepy Hollow is a village in the town of Mount Pleasant, in Westchester County, New York, United States. To the south of Sleepy Hollow is the village of Tarrytown, and to the north and east are unincorporated parts of Mount Pleasant. The population of the village at the 2020 census was 9,986.

Originally incorporated as North Tarrytown in the late 19th century, the village adopted its current name in 1996. The village is known internationally through "The Legend of Sleepy Hollow", an 1820 short story about the local area and its infamous specter, the Headless Horseman, written by Washington Irving, who lived in Tarrytown and is buried in Sleepy Hollow Cemetery. Owing to this story, as well as the village's roots in early American history and folklore, Sleepy Hollow is considered by some to be one of the "most haunted places in the world". Despite this designation, Sleepy Hollow has also been called "the safest small 'city' [i.e., under 100,000 residents] in America".

The village is home to the Philipsburg Manor House and the Old Dutch Church of Sleepy Hollow, as well as the Sleepy Hollow Cemetery, where in addition to Irving, numerous other notable people are buried.

History

The land that would become Sleepy Hollow was first bought from Adriaen van der Donck, a patroon in New Netherland before the English takeover in 1664. Starting in 1672 Frederick Philipse began acquiring large parcels of land mainly in today's southern Westchester County. Philipse was granted a royal charter in 1693, creating the Manor of Philipsburg and establishing him as first lord.

In today's Sleepy Hollow, he established an upper mill and shipping depot, today part of the Philipse Manor House historic site. A pious man, he was architect and financier of the town's Old Dutch Church, and was said to have built the pulpit with his own hands.

When Philipse died in 1702, the manor was divided between his son, Adolphus Philipse, and his grandson, Frederick Philipse II. Adolph received the Upper Mills property, which extended from Dobbs Ferry to the Croton River. Frederick II was given the Lower Mills at the confluence of the Saw Mill and Hudson Rivers, the two parcels being reunited on his uncle's death. His son, Frederick III, became the third lord of the manor in 1751.

In 1779, Frederick Philipse III, a Loyalist, was attainted for treason. The manor was confiscated and sold at public auction, split between 287 buyers. The largest tract of land (about ) was at the Upper Mills; it passed to numerous owners until 1951, when it was acquired by Sleepy Hollow Restorations.

Geography
Sleepy Hollow is located at  (41.091998, −73.864361).

Demographics

As of the census of 2010, there were 9,870 people, 3,181 households, and 2,239 families residing in the village. The population density was 4,054.7 people per square mile (1,566.9/km2). There were 3,253 housing units at an average density of 1,431.8 per square mile (553.3/km2). The racial makeup of the village was 61.0% Caucasian, 6.2% African American, 0.8% Native American, 3.3% Asian, <0.1% Pacific Islander, 23.5% from other races, and 5.2% from two or more races. Hispanic or Latino people of any race were 51.0% of the population, many of whom are Ecuadorian, Dominican, Chilean, and Puerto Rican. Sleepy Hollow has one of the highest proportions of Ecuadorian American residents of any community nationwide, standing at 17.5% as of the 2010 census.

There were 3,181 households, out of which 36.0% had children under the age of 18 living with them, 51.5% were married couples living together, 13.4% had a female householder with no husband present, and 29.6% were non-families. 23.0% of all households were made up of individuals, and 8.7% had someone living alone who was 65 years of age or older. The average household size was 2.89 and the average family size was 3.37.

In the village, the population was spread out, with 25.0% under the age of 18, 8.9% from 18 to 24, 36.7% from 25 to 44, 18.9% from 45 to 64, and 10.5% who were 65 years of age or older. The median age was 34 years. For every 100 females, there were 103.0 males. For every 100 females age 18 and over, there were 101.9 males.

The median income for a household in the village was $54,201, and the median income for a family was $63,889. Males had a median income of $39,923 versus $32,146 for females. The per capita income for the village was $28,325. About 5.7% of families and 7.4% of the population were below the poverty line, including 9.3% of those under age 18 and 7.9% of those age 65 or over.

Notable landmarks

The Edward Harden Mansion, now serving as the administration building for the Public Schools of the Tarrytowns, Patriot's Park, Philipse Manor Railroad Station, Sleepy Hollow Cemetery, and the Tarrytown Light are all listed on the National Register of Historic Places.  The Old Dutch Church of Sleepy Hollow and Philipsburg Manor House are listed as National Historic Landmarks. Also of note are Kingsland Point Park (allegedly haunted by the spirit of Captain Kidd, an associate of Philipse), Philipse Manor Beach Club, Sleepy Hollow Manor (residential neighborhood on the former estate of renowned explorer and politician John C. Frémont, whose now-updated house still overlooks the Hudson River there), segments of the Old Croton Aqueduct, and the Rockefeller State Park Preserve.

Emergency services

, the village's police department had 27 officers, four school crossing guards, and three civilian employees.
The village is also served by the New York State Police and Westchester County Department of Public Safety.
Police officers from the villages of Sleepy Hollow and Dobbs Ferry, the town of Greenburgh, and the New York State Police make up a Marine / H.E.A.T. Unit.
As of 2006, police base salaries in Sleepy Hollow were low compared to other Westchester County forces, in part due to the lower tax base.

The Sleepy Hollow Fire Department began with organization of the North Tarrytown Fire Patrol on May 26, 1876. Within 25 years it had grown to five companies in three fire stations. As of 2019, there were three engines (Engines 85, 86 and 87), one tower ladder (Tower Ladder 38), one rescue (Rescue 12), and other equipment. The fire department is run by volunteers and responds to over 300 calls each year. The local hospital, Phelps Memorial, responds to hundreds of emergencies per year.

Emergency medical services in Sleepy Hollow depend on volunteers assisted by paid staff. The Ambulance Corps has two basic life support ambulances. Mount Pleasant Paramedics provides advanced life support.

In popular culture
Sleepy Hollow has been used as a setting or filming location for numerous media works, including films, games, literature, motion pictures, and television productions, including:
Literature
 Sleepy Hollow is the setting of Washington Irving's short story "The Legend of Sleepy Hollow" (1820), its many adaptations in other media, and its major characters, Ichabod Crane and The Headless Horseman.

Films
 The Curse of the Cat People (1944)
 The second segment of Walt Disney's The Adventures of Ichabod and Mr. Toad (1949)
 The Scarlet Coat (1955), partially about American Revolutionary War general Benedict Arnold's associate John Andre's real-life capture in the village
 the film adaptation of the Dark Shadows television series, House of Dark Shadows (1970)
 Woody Allen's film Mighty Aphrodite (1995)
 Sidney Lumet's film remake Gloria (1999)
 the film remake The Thomas Crown Affair (1999)
 Tim Burton's Sleepy Hollow (1999), made primarily in England
 the film The Family Man (2000)
 the film Super Troopers (2001)
 the film Lord of War (2005)
 Robert De Niro's film The Good Shepherd (2006)
 the film Why Stop Now (2012)
 the film The English Teacher (2013)
 the Stephen King film adaptation A Good Marriage (2014)
 the film adaptation The Girl on the Train (2016)
 the film The Meyerowitz Stories (2017), filmed primarily in and around Northwell Health's Phelps Memorial Hospital Center
 the film Wonderstruck (2017)

Games
 One of the locations in Magicland Dizzy is named after the village (1990).
 Sleepy Hollow is a location in the game Assassin's Creed Rogue (2014).

Television
 The four-season television series Sleepy Hollow, though set in and around the village through the centuries, greatly expanded its population to 144,000, as indicated by a sign at the beginning of the pilot episode. Most of the series was filmed in North Carolina and Georgia, though several aerial shots of the actual village and surrounding region are incorporated into the series.
 Television personality and former elite athlete Caitlyn Jenner, who attended Sleepy Hollow High School, led TV journalist Diane Sawyer on a tour of the village and neighboring Tarrytown during her landmark coming-out interview on 20/20 in 2015.
Television shot on location in Sleepy Hollow includes:
 the "Tale of the Midnight Ride" episode of the television series Are You Afraid of the Dark?
 an episode of the television series Property Brothers during its Westchester-dedicated season
 the television series Divorce starring Sarah Jessica Parker
 the "Two Boats and a Helicopter" episode of the television series The Leftovers
 the television series Sneaky Pete
 the television series The Path
 an episode of the television series Man v. Food
 the Showtime miniseries Escape at Dannemora
 the television series Pose
 the Netflix revival of the series Tales of the City
 an episode of the television series The Blacklist
 an episode of the Craig Silverstein developed, AMC show TURN: Washington’s Spies

Notable people
 Guy Adami, professional investor, trader and television personality
 Bob Akin (1936–2002), business executive, journalist, television commentator and champion sports car racing driver
 Dave Anthony, stand-up comedian, writer, actor and podcaster
 Fay Baker (1917–1987), actress and author
 Kathleen Beller, actress
 Clarence Clough Buel (1850–1933), editor and author
 Keith Hamilton Cobb, actor best known for The Young and the Restless
 Abraham de Revier Sr. (–), early American historian and elder of the Old Dutch Church of Sleepy Hollow
 Vincent Desiderio, realist painter
 Karen Finley, performance artist
 John C. Frémont (1813–1890), military officer, explorer, and politician who became the first candidate of the anti-slavery Republican Party for the office of President of the United States
 Margaret Hardenbroeck (–), merchant in colonial New York and wife of Frederick Philipse, Lord of Philipse Manor
 Elsie Janis (1889–1956), singer, songwriter, actress, and screenwriter
 Tom Keene (1896–1963), actor best known for King Vidor's film classic Our Daily Bread and Ed Wood's film Plan 9 from Outer Space
 Ambrose Kingsland (1804–1878), wealthy merchant and mayor of New York City
 Karl Knortz (1841–1918), German-American author and champion of American literature
 Leatherman (–), distinctive 19th century Northeastern United States vagabond
 Joseph L. Levesque, former President of Niagara University
 Joan Lorring (1926–2014), Academy Award-nominated actress and singer
 Ted Mack (1904–1976), radio and television host best known for The Original Amateur Hour
 Ralph G. Martin (1920–2013), author and journalist
 Donald Moffat (1930–2018), British actor
 Frank Murphy (1876-1912), Major League Baseball player
 Eric Paschall, NBA basketball player
 Frederick Philipse (–1702), Lord of the Manor of Philipseborough (Philipsburg)
 Nelson Rockefeller (1908–1979), businessman, politician, the 41st Vice President of the United States
 Adam Savage, co-host of the television show MythBusters
 Gregg L. Semenza, Nobel Prize-awarded physician, researcher, and professor
 Dirck Storm (1630–1716), early colonial American known for the Het Notite Boeck record of Dutch village life in New York
 Worcester Reed Warner (1846–1929), mechanical engineer, entrepreneur, manager, astronomer, and philanthropist
 General James Watson Webb (1802–1884), United States diplomat, newspaper publisher, and New York politician

See also
 Administrative divisions of New York
 Historic Hudson Valley

References

External links

 Village of Sleepy Hollow official website
 The Hudson Independent (local paper)
 Tarrytown-Sleepy Hollow Patch
 

 
Villages in New York (state)
Rockefeller family
Villages in Westchester County, New York
New York (state) populated places on the Hudson River
Mount Pleasant, New York
Washington Irving